MarQueis Gray (born November 7, 1989) is a former American football tight end. He played college football at Minnesota, and was originally signed by the San Francisco 49ers as an undrafted free agent in 2013. He has also been a member of the Cleveland Browns, Minnesota Vikings, Buffalo Bills, Miami Dolphins, and San Francisco 49ers.

High school career
Gray went to Ben Davis High School in Indianapolis, Indiana. There, he was coached by Mike Kirschner, where he was a three-year starter. He was rated as a four-star prospect by Rivals.com, as well as the No. 3 dual-threat quarterback in the nation and the No. 1 player in the state of Indiana by Rivals. He received four stars from Scout.com, which ranks him as the nation's No. 14 high school quarterback, and ESPN.com's No. 13 quarterback nationally, where he was selected to participate in the Elite 11 Quarterback Camp, and played in the prestigious U.S. Army All-American Bowl, completing 3-of-7 passes for 56 yards and a touchdown, while rushing for 41 yards and a touchdown. He missed the majority of his senior season after suffering a broken bone in his non-throwing arm, and saw action in just five games during 2007, including three after returning from the injury, and connected on 26-of-41 passes for 376 yards and three touchdowns while also rushing for 302 yards on 64 carries with four touchdowns and caught five passes for 86 yards and a score. As a junior, he completed 73 of 140 passes for 1,113 yards and 12 touchdowns, while rushing for 603 yards and seven touchdowns on 127 carries. He earned honorable mention Class 5A all-state honors.

Gray committed to University of Minnesota on January 5, 2008. Gray also had offers of football scholarships from the University of Cincinnati, the University of Illinois, Indiana University, the University of Iowa, Kentucky University, Michigan State University, the University of Oregon, and Purdue University.

College career
Gray was forced to sit out his true freshman season in 2008 after his ACT score was deemed invalid due to unspecified "irregularities."

Gray returned to the team in the spring of 2009 and impressed observers in the Golden Gophers' spring game.  Gray played in 2009 as both a quarterback and wide receiver. He had a breakout game against Ohio State going 5-of-6 passing for 51 yards and tossing his first touchdown pass, all career highs, he also had a career day running ball against the Buckeyes with career highs of 11 carries and 81 yards. He scored his first collegiate touchdown on a reception against Cal. He finished his freshman season with 265 yards rushing, he ended the regular season as the team's fourth-leading rusher.

Gray played both positions in the Insight Bowl, inserted as a backup to starting quarterback Adam Weber going 1-of-2 for 11 yards, with three carries for 34 yards. One of those carries — in the fourth quarter — resulted in a fumble, recovered by Iowa State who were able to run out the clock for a 14-13 victory. Gray also caught two passes for 37 yards.

As a sophomore in 2010, Gray made appearances in all 12 games including seven starts at wide receiver, where he tallied 42 catches for 587 yards and hauled in five touchdowns. He also had 119 rushing yards on 23 carries while completing two of eight passes for 24 yards.

Gray was named the starting quarterback for the Gophers for the 2011 season. On the season, he passed for 1,495 yards, eight touchdowns, and eight interceptions.

In 2012, in the Gophers' second game against New Hampshire, Gray surpassed Rickey Foggie and Billy Cockerham with the fifth 100-yard rushing game of his career. He was moved to wide receiver for the rest of the season to allow Philip Nelson to start.

Statistics

Professional career
At the NFL Scouting Combine, Gray posted a 4.30-second 20-yard shuttle, a 7.25 three-cone drill, a 111.0-inch broad jump, a 30.0-inch vertical jump, a 15-repetition bench press, and ran a 4.73-second forty-yard dash, the fourth fastest time among quarterbacks. Though he played some wide receiver in college, Gray worked out with the quarterback group at the NFL Scouting Combine.

San Francisco 49ers
After going undrafted at the 2013 NFL Draft, Gray signed with the San Francisco 49ers. Initially Gray worked out as a halfback but soon moved to tight end. During the 2013 preseason, Gray caught one pass for 13 yards against the Kansas City Chiefs. Gray was later cut by the team on August 30.

Cleveland Browns
On September 1, 2013, Gray was claimed off waivers by the Cleveland Browns. He was used mostly as a blocking tight end and a fullback/H-back, and was also the emergency third string quarterback. Gray was waived by the Browns on August 30, 2014 during the final round of roster cuts.

Minnesota Vikings
On August 31, 2014, Gray was claimed off waivers by the Minnesota Vikings, but was waived by the team on November 19, 2014 to make room for the newly acquired Ben Tate. He caught one pass with the Vikings for 16 yards, in their loss against the Green Bay Packers in Week 5.

Buffalo Bills
On November 20, 2014, Gray was claimed off waivers by the Buffalo Bills, On October 6, 2015, the Bills sent Gray to season ending injured reserve with a broken forearm. He would finish the season with just one catch for two yards in four games.

Miami Dolphins
On March 31, 2016, Gray signed with the Miami Dolphins. On December 29, 2016, he signed a two-year contract extension with the Dolphins. Gray has taken snaps at fullback as well for the Dolphins, occasionally receiving short-yardage carries. Overall, in the 2016 season, he finished with 14 receptions for 174 yards in 16 games. In the 2017 season, he appeared in all 16 games and finished with five carries for 14 yards and one reception for 10 yards.

On September 6, 2018, Gray was placed on injured reserve after suffering a torn Achilles tendon in practice, ending his season before it began. The injury did not heal correctly, so Gray underwent additional surgery in March 2019, forcing him to sit out that year's season as well; he has stated that he hopes to return to the NFL in 2020.

San Francisco 49ers (second stint)
On August 29, 2020, Gray signed with the San Francisco 49ers. He was released during final roster cutdowns on September 5.

NFL career statistics

Regular season

References

External links
 Minnesota profile

1989 births
Living people
Players of American football from Indianapolis
African-American players of American football
American football quarterbacks
American football tight ends
American football wide receivers
Minnesota Golden Gophers football players
San Francisco 49ers players
Cleveland Browns players
Minnesota Vikings players
Buffalo Bills players
Miami Dolphins players
21st-century African-American sportspeople
20th-century African-American people